"Peg" is a song by the American rock group Steely Dan, first released on the band's 1977 album Aja. The track was released as a single in 1977 and reached number 11 on the US Billboard chart in 1978 and number eight on the Cash Box chart. With a chart run of 19 weeks, "Peg" is tied with "Rikki Don't Lose That Number" and "Hey Nineteen" for being Steely Dan's longest-running chart hit. In Canada, "Peg" spent three weeks at number seven during March 1978.

Music and lyrics 
"Peg" has been described by AllMusic critic Stephen Thomas Erlewine as a "sunny pop" song with "layers of jazzy vocal harmonies", while music scholar Stephen K. Valdez said it features a fusion of jazz and rock elements. In the opinion of jazz musician and academic Andy LaVerne, the song "has the blues at its core, though it might not be apparent at first listen".

The song's guitar solo was attempted by seven top studio session guitarists—including Robben Ford and recurring guitarist Larry Carlton—before Jay Graydon's version became the "keeper". He worked on the song for about six hours before the band was satisfied.

Graydon spoke about his famous guitar solo in a 2014 interview:

Michael McDonald provides multi-tracked backup vocals in the choruses, and keyboardist Paul Griffin can be heard talking and improvising background vocals in the final chorus and fadeout.

Although there was speculation that the name was a reference to Broadway star and one-time Hollywood actress Peg Entwistle, in 2000 the band said the song was written about a real person but not Entwistle. In 2020, Donald Fagen said "There's no hidden meaning. We just wanted a dotted half note for that spot and 'Peg' was short enough to fit with the music." Fagen added that the song "takes place at a seedy photo shoot in L.A...from the perspective of [a] jilted boyfriend."

Legacy
Pitchfork rated "Peg" as its 87th best song of the 1970s, describing it as the "perfect Steely Dan song, and one of the strangest hits to ever grace the mainstream." Drummer Rick Marotta calls "Peg" one of the greatest tracks he has ever played on. In 2017, Dan Weiss of Billboard ranked the song third on his list of the top 15 Steely Dan songs, and in 2020, Phil Freeman of Stereogum ranked the song second on his list of the top 10 Steely Dan songs.

Billboard praised the "sarcastic" lyrics, the "stinging instrumental break" and the "chilling" piano playing. Cash Box wrote, "this snappy number has the beat and the harmonic hooks to capture that extra top 40 momentum." Record World called it "a pop-rock love song, crafted with [Steely Dan's] usual perfectionism and flair."

The song was used as the theme music for a celebrity paparazzi segment by the syndicated news magazine Entertainment Tonight from 1981 to 1985.

"Peg" was heavily sampled on the 1989 De La Soul song "Eye Know". It was covered by Nerina Pallot in 2007 and in 2014 by Donny Osmond.

Chart performance

Weekly charts

Year-end charts

Personnel
Source: Adapted from Aja liner notes.

 Donald Fagen – lead vocals
 Michael McDonald – backing vocals
 Jay Graydon – lead guitar
 Steve Khan – rhythm guitar
 Paul Griffin – Fender Rhodes electric piano, backing vocals
 Don Grolnick – clavinet
 Chuck Rainey – bass guitar
 Rick Marotta – drums
 Victor Feldman, Gary Coleman – percussion
 Tom Scott – Lyricon

References

External links
 

1977 singles
1977 songs
Steely Dan songs
Songs written by Donald Fagen
Songs written by Walter Becker
ABC Records singles
Song recordings produced by Gary Katz